The Trial is an Italian television mini-series, composed of 8 episodes, created by Alessandro Fabbri, in collaboration with Laura Colella and Enrico Audenino, and directed by Stefano Lodovichi.

It originally aired in Italy in November 2019 and was released on Netflix on 10 April 2020.

Synopsis
The protagonist is a successful prosecutor, Elena Guerra, who is about to take a leave of absence from her public prosecutor job in Mantua, Italy, to go to New York where her husband has accepted a job. This plan is upended when she is assigned a delicate case where a very wealthy local woman Linda Monaco is accused of brutally murdering Angelica Petroni, a 17 year old found dead in a canal. Linda is defended by the noted and very ambitious criminal defense lawyer Ruggero Barone.

Cast
Vittoria Puccini as Elena Guerra
Francesco Scianna as Ruggero Barone
Margherita Caviezel as Angelica Petronio
Camilla Filippi as Linda Monaco
Michele Morrone as Claudio Cavalleria
Maurizio Lastrico as Giovanni Malaguti
Simone Colombari as Giacomo Andreoli
Alessandro Averone as Stefano Lanzoni
Pia Lanciotti as Fabrizia Furlan
Tommaso Ragno as Gabriele Monaco
Euridice Axen as Mara Raimondi
Roberto Herlitzka as Giancarlo Guerra

Production
The series was co-produced by Lucky Red and RTI.

Filming
The series was filmed in the city of Mantua. Locations include: Palazzo Te, Piazza Sordello, Palazzo d'Arco, Palazzo Beccaguti, Palazzo Cavriani, Palazzo Andreani and the lakes of Mantua, as well as some scenes in Rome.

Reception
Rated a 9 of 10 by Rotten Tomatoes with viewer comments that the acting is very good, the Mantua story's setting in north central Italy interesting, but the dialog, dubbed in English, at times doesn't correlate well with the video.

See also
List of Italian television series

References

External links
 
 

Italian television series
Television series about prosecutors
Canale 5 original programming